L is the second and last album released by alternative rock group the Caulfields. The album was released on compact disc on April 22, 1997, by A&M Records.

Track listing
"Figure It Out" – 3:47
"President of Nothing" – 3:59 
"Waiting to Cry" – 2:52	 
"Once Upon a Time" – 4:40	 
"Invincible" – 3:22
"Book of Your Life" – 3:17	 
"The Kitchen Debate" – 3:13	 
"Skeleton Key" – 3:46	 
"All I Want Is Out" – 3:29	 
"All Things to All People" – 3:01
"Atlas Daughter" – 3:34
"Heaven on the Moon" – 4:14
"Beard of Bees" – 2:52
"Tomorrow Morning" – 3:54
"Born Yesterday" – 3:59

References

1997 albums
The Caulfields albums
A&M Records albums